is a Japanese skier. He competed in the Nordic combined event at the 1960 Winter Olympics.

References

External links
 

1939 births
Living people
Japanese male Nordic combined skiers
Olympic Nordic combined skiers of Japan
Nordic combined skiers at the 1960 Winter Olympics
Sportspeople from Iwate Prefecture